Foreign relations exist between Austria and France.  Both countries have had diplomatic relations with each other since the Middle Ages. For historical relations between France and the Habsburg Empire, see French–Habsburg relations. Both countries are full members of the European Union.

Resident diplomatic missions 
 Austria has an embassy in Paris and a consulate-general in Strasbourg.
 France has an embassy in Vienna.

See also  
Foreign relations of Austria 
Foreign relations of France
List of Ambassadors of France to Austria
Austrians in France
Frenchs in Austria

References 

 
France
Bilateral relations of France